Ned Benson (born April 3, 1977) is an American filmmaker.

Biography
He attended Deerfield Academy and graduated from Columbia University in 2001. Benson had a long-term relationship with Jessica Chastain, but they broke up in 2010.
After working on The Westerner, Benson made his directorial debut film The Disappearance of Eleanor Rigby. After Chastain asked questions about the background, Benson wrote another script devoted entirely to her perspective and she joined the cast. It was shot as two films simultaneously. They were premiered at the 2013 Toronto International Film Festival under the title The Disappearance of Eleanor Rigby: Him and Her  Benson later edited the films into one film The Disappearance of Eleanor Rigby: Them which premiered at the 2014 Cannes Film Festival. The Weinstein Company had a limited release in September 2014. On January 16, 2019, Benson and Jac Schaeffer served as story writers for Black Widow. He was later replaced by Eric Pearson.

Filmography

References

External links

1977 births
Living people
Film producers from New York (state)
American male screenwriters
Columbia College (New York) alumni
Film directors from New York City
Writers from New York City
Screenwriters from New York (state)
Deerfield Academy alumni